Augusto C. Sandino International Airport  or ACS is the main joint civil-military public international airport in Managua, Nicaragua. It is named after Nicaraguan revolutionary Augusto Nicolás Sandino (1895–1934) and located in the City's 6th ward, known locally as Distrito 6. Originally christened as Las Mercedes Airport in 1968, it was later renamed Augusto C. Sandino International Airport during the Sandinista government in the 1980s and again in 2001 to Managua International Airport by then-president Arnoldo Alemán. Its name was changed once more in February 2007 to its current name by President Daniel Ortega to honor the revolutionary. Managua also has an alternative landing strip at Punta Huete Airport. Punta Huete was designed for larger aircraft. This alternative landing site, however, does not service commercial aircraft. The airport is managed by the state-run Administrative Company of International Airports, more commonly known as the EAAI given its Spanish name, the Empresa Administradora de Aeropuertos Internacionales.

The runway at the airport is 8,012 ft long, and it is located at an elevation of 194 feet.

History
Before ACS, there was the old Xolotlan Airport, about 2 miles east of Managua, built in 1915 which very soon became too small for Managua's airline service growth.  Thus, on January 22, 1942, the Nicaraguan Government and Pan American Airways signed a contract to construct an airport by Las Mercedes Country Estate which inspired the name for Las Mercedes Airport. Las Mercedes was further upgraded, re-designed to handle Boeing 707 aircraft, and re-inaugurated on July 4, 1968, by Anastasio Somoza Debayle.

In the early 1970s, Las Mercedes was expanded to more modern standards, such as four health inspectors, eight immigration officers and ten customs inspectors. It was considered fully equipped, having air conditioning, background music, loudspeakers and conveyor belts for baggage handling. It also had a restaurant on its upper floor where visitors and travelers could see airport movement.

The expanded airport could serve three aircraft at once and by 1975 LANICA, the National Airline of Nicaragua, as well as many well known carriers Pan Am, KLM (Royal Dutch Airlines), Taca Airlines, Sahsa, Avianca, Iberia, SAM, TAN, Varig, and smaller local carriers, flew into Las Mercedes. When the Sandinistas took power, the airport was named after Augusto César Sandino, a Nicaraguan revolutionary and guerrilla leader, after whom the Sandinista movement is named. The Sandinistas however did not maintain the airport, and it began to deteriorate until it was expanded and remodeled in 1996, when, among other things, two new boarding bridges were installed. The airport was renamed "Managua International Airport" in 2001 by then President Arnoldo Alemán and renamed again in 2007 to its current name by President Daniel Ortega In mid 2007, President Daniel Ortega renamed the airport in honor of Sandino. Nicaraguan artist Róger Pérez de la Rocha has created two large portraits of Augusto César Sandino, and Rubén Darío which they lay at the airports lobby.

Las Mercedes served for a very long time as a hub for Nicaragua's flag carriers Lanica (until 1978), Aeronica from 1979 to the 80's and NICA afterwards. When NICA became a member of Grupo TACA during the 1990s, the number of important connections to the rest of Latin America from which ACS grew considerably.

According to EAAI (Empresa Administradora de Aeropuertos Internacionales) ACS is the most modern airport in Central America and the 4th safest in the world.

Expansion
A large expansion programme was underway by 2003 and as of July 2006 the final phase was completed with 7 gates equipped with jetways, and room for 20 airplanes to park.

Facilities within the airport include a tourist information desk, bank, restaurants, bars, post office, souvenir shops, duty-free shops, lounges and more. The types of services in the VIP lounge include checking baggage and documents with customs and immigration plus the airline; a bar service; snacks etc.

Operations
Augusto C. Sandino International Airport is Nicaragua's main international gateway. Domestic flights fly between Bluefields and the Corn Islands airports while also serving a number of airstrips to the country's east. The airport is accessed by the Panamerican Highway, known as the Carretera Norte.

Airlines and destinations

Passenger

Cargo

Statistics

Traffic figures

Top international destinations

Traffic Share of Airlines flying to MGA

See also

 List of airports in Nicaragua
 Transport in Nicaragua

References

Airports in Nicaragua
Buildings and structures in Managua